During the 2009–10 German football season, Borussia Dortmund competed in the Bundesliga.

Season summary
Dortmund finished in fifth, one place higher than in last season. This saw them qualify for the Europa League.

First-team squad
Squad at end of season

Left club during season

Competitions

Bundesliga

League table

DFB-Pokal

References

Notes

Borussia Dortmund seasons
Borussia Dortmund